HMS Duke of York was a  battleship of the Royal Navy. Laid down in May 1937, the ship was constructed by John Brown and Company at Clydebank, Scotland, and commissioned into the Royal Navy on 4 November 1941, subsequently seeing combat service during the Second World War.

In mid-December 1941, Duke of York transported Prime Minister Winston Churchill to the United States to meet President Franklin D. Roosevelt. The journey through the seas were rough even for the North Atlantic, Churchill wrote to his wife "Being in a ship in such weather as this is like being in a prison, with the extra chance of being drowned." Between March and September 1942 Duke of York was involved with convoy escort duties, including as flagship of the Heavy Covering Force of Convoy PQ-17, but in October she was dispatched to Gibraltar where she became the flagship of Force H.

In October 1942, Duke of York was involved in the Allied invasion of North Africa, but saw little action as her role only required her to protect the accompanying aircraft carriers. Duke of York stopped the Portuguese vessel Gil Eannes on 1 November 1942 and a commando arrested Gastão de Freitas Ferraz. The British had picked up radio traffic indicating naval espionage, possibly compromising the secrecy of the upcoming Operation Torch.

After Operation Torch, Duke of York was involved in Operations Camera and Governor, which were diversionary operations designed to draw the Germans' attention away from Operation Husky, the invasion of Sicily. On 4 October, Duke of York operated with her sister ship  in covering a force of Allied cruisers and destroyers and the American carrier , during Operation Leader, which raided German shipping off Norway. The attack sank four merchant ships and badly damaged a further seven.

During the engagement that followed, Scharnhorst hit Duke of York twice with little effect, but was herself hit by several of Duke of Yorks 14-inch shells, silencing one of her turrets and hitting a boiler room. After temporarily escaping from Duke of Yorks heavy fire, Scharnhorst was struck several times by torpedoes, allowing Duke of York to again open fire, contributing to the eventual sinking of Scharnhorst after a running action lasting ten-and-a-half hours.

In 1945, Duke of York was assigned to the British Pacific Fleet as its flagship, but suffered mechanical problems in Malta which prevented her arriving in time to see any action before Japan surrendered.

After the war, Duke of York remained active until she was laid up in November 1951. She was eventually scrapped in 1957.

Construction 
In the aftermath of the First World War, the Washington Naval Treaty was drawn up in 1922 in an effort to stop an arms race developing between Britain, Japan, France, Italy and the United States. These restrictions were extended in 1930 through the Treaty of London, but by the mid-1930s Japan and Italy had withdrawn from both of these treaties and the British became concerned about the lack of modern battleships in the Royal Navy. Due to the provisions of both the Washington Naval Treaty and the Treaty of London, both of which were still in effect when the King George Vs were being designed, the main armament of the class was limited to the  guns. They were the only battleships built at that time to adhere to the treaty and even though it soon became apparent to the British that the other signatories to the treaty were ignoring its requirements, it was too late to change the design of the class before they were laid down in 1937.

Duke of York was the third ship in the King George V class, and was laid down at John Brown & Company's shipyard in Clydebank, Scotland, on 5 May 1937. The title of Duke of York was in abeyance at that time, having been that held by King George VI prior to his succession to the throne in December 1936. The battleship was launched on 28 February 1940 and completed on 4 November 1941, and joined the Home Fleet at Scapa Flow.

Description 

Duke of York displaced  as built and  fully loaded.

She was powered by Parsons geared steam turbines, driving four propeller shafts. Steam was provided by eight Admiralty 3-drum water-tube boilers which normally delivered , but could deliver  at emergency overload.

Armament 
Duke of York mounted 10 BL  Mk VII guns, which were mounted in one Mark II twin turret forward and two Mark III quadruple turrets, one forward and one aft. The guns could be elevated 40 degrees and depressed 3 degrees, while their training arcs varied. Turret "A" was able to traverse 286 degrees, while turrets "B" and "Y" could both move through 270 degrees. Hydraulic drives were used in the training and elevating process, achieving rates of two and eight degrees per second, respectively. The secondary armament consisted of 16 QF  Mk I dual purpose guns which were mounted in eight twin turrets. The guns could be elevated to 70 degrees and depressed to 5 degrees. The normal rate of fire was ten to twelve rounds per minute, but in practice the guns could fire only seven to eight rounds per minute.

Along with her main and secondary batteries, Duke of York carried 48 QF 2 pdr Mk.VIII "pom-pom" anti-aircraft guns in six octuple, power-driven, mountings. These were supplemented by six  Oerlikon light AA guns in single, hand-worked, mounts.

Operational history

Second World War 

In mid-December 1941, Duke of York embarked Prime Minister Winston Churchill for a trip to the United States to confer with President Franklin D. Roosevelt. She arrived at Annapolis, Maryland, on 22 December 1941, made a shakedown cruise to Bermuda in January 1942, and departed for Scapa Flow on 17 January with Churchill returning home by air.

On 1 March 1942, she provided close escort for Convoy PQ 12 in company with the battlecruiser , the cruiser , and six destroyers. On 6 March, that force was reinforced with one of Duke of Yorks sister-ships, and the aircraft carrier , the heavy cruiser , and six destroyers as a result of Admiral John Tovey's concerns that the battleship  might attempt to intercept the convoy. On 6 March, the German battleship put to sea and was sighted by a British submarine around 19:40; no contact was made, however, except for an unsuccessful aerial torpedo attack by aircraft from Victorious.

Later that month, Convoy PQ 13 was constituted and Duke of York again formed part of the escort force. In early April, Duke of York, King George V, and the carrier Victorious formed the core of a support force that patrolled between Iceland and Norway to cover several convoys to the Soviet Union. In late April, when King George V accidentally rammed and sank the destroyer  in dense fog, sustaining significant bow damage, Duke of York was sent to relieve her. She continued in these operations through May, when she was joined by the American battleship . In mid-September, Duke of York escorted Convoy QP 14.

In October 1942, Duke of York was sent to Gibraltar as the new flagship of Force H, and supported the Allied landings in North Africa the following month. After this action, Duke of York returned to Britain for a refit.

With her refit completed, Duke of York resumed her status as flagship from 14 May 1943 pending the departure of King George V and Howe for Operation Husky, the Allied invasion of Sicily. On 4 October, Duke of York and Anson covered a force of Allied cruisers and destroyers and the American carrier  under Operation Leader, which raided German shipping off Norway. The attack resulted in the sinking of four German merchant ships and damage to seven others, which forced many of them to be grounded.

Action against Scharnhorst 

In 1943, the German battleship Scharnhorst moved to Norway, a position whence she could threaten the Arctic convoys to Russia. With Tirpitz and two armoured ships also in Norwegian fjords, it was necessary for the Royal Navy to provide heavy escorts for convoys between Britain and Russia. One of these was sighted by the Germans in early December 1943, and Allied intelligence concluded that the following convoy, Convoy JW 55B, would be attacked by the German surface ships. Two surface forces (Forces 1 and 2) were assigned to provide distant cover to JW 55B, which had left Loch Ewe on 22 December. On 25 December 1943, Scharnhorst was reported at sea, escorted by five Narvik-class destroyers (Z-29, Z-30, Z-33, Z-34, and Z-38). Force 1, comprising the  heavy cruiser , and the  light cruisers  and Sheffield, made contact shortly after 0900 on 26 December. A brief gunnery engagement followed, without damage to Force 1, but two hits from a cruiser's guns upon Scharnhorst resulted in the destruction of her radar controls. In worsening weather, unable to effectively control her fire, Scharnhorst was unable to convert a tactical advantage of greater range and weight of shot. Fearing she was in a gunnery duel with a battleship, Scharnhorst turned away, outdistancing her pursuers. She again outran Force 1 after a second brief skirmish around noon that did not further damage Scharnhorst, but did result in hits on Norfolk which disabled a main battery turret and her radar. Kriegsmarine Konteradmiral (Rear Admiral) Erich Bey, aboard Scharnhorst, having already detached his destroyers to independently seek out Convoy JW 55B, ordered Scharnhorst to return to port at Altafjord, Norway.

But Scharnhorst altered course, and Belfast regained radar contact, passing it to Force 2. Belfast fired star shells at 1648 to illuminate Scharnhorst, followed by another star shell from one of Duke of Yorks  guns, taking Scharnhorst by surprise with her main battery trained fore and aft. Although under heavy fire, Scharnhorsts return fire straddled Duke of York a number of times and hit her twice. A  shell passed through the mainmast and its port leg without detonating, but fragments from the hit destroyed the cable for the main search radar. A  shell also pierced the port strut of the foremast without exploding. However, one shell from the final salvoes pierced Scharnhorsts armour belt and destroyed her No. 1 boiler room, slowing the ship and allowing the pursuing British destroyers to overtake her.

Force 2's destroyers attacked at 18:50 with torpedoes, launching 28 and scoring hits with four. At 19:15, Belfast also began shelling Scharnhorst, and both Belfast and Jamaica fired their remaining torpedoes. At least ten 14-inch shells had already hit the German battleship, causing fires and explosions, and silencing most of the secondary battery. Duke of York ceased fire at 19:30 to allow her escorting cruisers and destroyers to close on Scharnhorst. Following her sinking, and the retreat of most of the remaining German heavy surface units from Norway, the need to maintain powerful surface forces in British home waters diminished.

Subsequent operations 

On 29 March 1944, Duke of York and the bulk of the Home Fleet left Scapa Flow to provide a support force for Convoy JW 58. The ship operated in the Arctic and as cover for carriers conducting the Goodwood series of air strikes on Tirpitz in mid to late August. In September, when she was overhauled and partially modernized at Liverpool, radar equipment and additional anti-aircraft guns were added. She was then ordered to join the British Pacific Fleet and sailed in company with her sister-ship Anson on 25 April 1945. A problem with the ship's electrical circuitry delayed her while she was at Malta and, as a result, she did not reach Sydney until 29 July, by which time it too late for her to take any meaningful part in hostilities against the Japanese.

Nevertheless, in early August, Duke of York was assigned to Task Force 37, along with four aircraft carriers and her sister-ship King George V. From 9 August, TF 37 and three American carrier task forces conducted a series of air raids on Japan, which continued until 15 August when a surrender came into effect. After the conclusion of hostilities, Duke of York, alongside her sister-ship, King George V, participated in the surrender ceremonies that took place in Tokyo Bay. The following month Duke of York sailed for Hong Kong, to join the fleet that assembled there to accept the surrender of the Japanese garrison. She was the flagship of the British Pacific Fleet when the Japanese surrendered, and remained so until June 1946, when she returned to Plymouth for an overhaul.

Post war 

Duke of York was flagship of the Home Fleet following the end of the war and remained in active service until April 1949. She was laid up in November 1951, and on 18 May 1957, she was ordered scrapped. She was broken up by Shipbreaking Industries, Ltd., in Faslane. The ship's bell was salvaged and given to the Duke of York School (since renamed the Lenana School) in Nairobi, Kenya.

Refits 
During her career, Duke of York was refitted on several occasions to bring her equipment up-to-date. The following are the dates and details of the refits undertaken.

Notes

Citations

Bibliography

External links 

 Maritimequest HMS Duke of York pages
 Alan Sutherland RN Collection on MaritimeQuest
 Newsreel footage of HMS Duke of York (last quarter of the clip).
 HMS Duke of York in heavy seas while on Arctic convoy duty

 

King George V-class battleships (1939)
Ships built on the River Clyde
1940 ships
World War II battleships of the United Kingdom